The 2015 Asian Canoe Sprint Championships were the 16th Asian Canoe Sprint Championships and took place from November 4–7, 2015 in Palembang, Indonesia.

Medal summary

Men

Women

Medal table

References

External links
Asian Canoe Confederation

Canoe Sprint Championships
Asian Canoe Sprint Championships
Asian Canoeing Championships
International sports competitions hosted by Indonesia